WPOA can refer to:

Western Pacific Orthopaedic Association
Weak phase object approximation in High-resolution transmission electron microscopy
Water Park of America